Jeong-dong is a legal dong, or neighbourhood of the Jung-gu district in Seoul, South Korea and governed by its administrative dong, Sogong-dong.

It is an historical area with Deoksu Palace from the Joseon Dynasty and some of Korea's first modern schools and churches. It also home to contemporary museums, galleries and theaters along tree-lined streets and cobblestone alleyways.

Festival 

 Jeong-dong Culture Night - It is the place where modern Western culture first took root, including Deoksugung Palace where the king stayed during the Joseon Dynasty. Ewha School, Baejae School, Jeongdong jaeil Church etc. have been around for more than 100 years to tell the vivid history of Jeong-dong. Jeong-dong Culture Night offers various cultural experiences for domestic and international visitors. Programs such as Eoga Parade, military music parade, concerts, story-telling, busking and film exhibitions will be held in connection with the Seoul Metropolitan Government.

Attractions
Deoksugung
Doldam-gil (or Stonewall Road)

Education
Schools located in Jeong-dong:
 Yewon School
 Changdeok Girls' Middle School
 Ewha Girls' High School

See also 
Administrative divisions of South Korea

References

External links
 Jung-gu Official site in English
 Jung-gu Official site
 Jung-gu Tour Guide from the Official site
 Status quo of Jung-gu 
 Resident offices and maps of Jung-gu

Neighbourhoods of Jung-gu, Seoul
Tourist attractions in Seoul